Coal Run is a tributary of Shamokin Creek in Northumberland County, Pennsylvania, in the United States. The stream is designated as an impaired waterbody due to metals from abandoned mine drainage. It is an ephemeral stream. Virtually all of the watershed is in coal mining regions.

Various sawmills and coal mines have historically been constructed on Coal Run. A number of bridges have also been built across the stream. Its drainage basin is designated as a Coldwater Fishery and a Migratory Fishery and was historically inhabited by trout.

Course

Coal Run begins in a lake in Mount Carmel Township. It flows east-southeast through a valley for several tenths of a mile before entering Coal Township. The stream continues flowing east-southeast for more than a mile before turning south for a short distance. It then turns southwest for a few tenths of a mile before turning south for a few tenths of a mile. After this, the stream crosses Pennsylvania Route 61 and passes near the census-designated place of Ranshaw. The stream then flows in a west-northwesterly direction for several tenths of a mile, passing through the census-designated place of Marshalton before entering Shamokin. The stream then flows west for a few tenths of a mile until it reaches its confluence with Shamokin Creek.

Hydrology
The entire length of Coal Run is designated as an impaired waterbody. The cause of the impairment is metals and the source of the impairment is abandoned mine drainage. The stream is one of several in the watershed of Shamokin Creek to be impacted by abandoned mine drainage, although it is not seriously impacted. However, it is fairly consistently neutral or alkaline, with an average pH of 6.5, though its pH can be as low as 4.8. The stream's water comes from mine discharges such as the Greenough Mine discharge, the Nielson Mine discharge, and the Luke Fidler Mine discharge. The stream is also impacted by raw sewage discharges. In the early 1900s, mine water from the Richards No. 4 Colliery entered the stream. Numerous other streams of black waste water from other collieries discharged into the stream as well.

Coal Run is an ephemeral stream. The turbidity of the stream ranged from 0.0 to 4.0 Nephelometric Turbidity Units.

Geography and geology

Coal deposits occur in the watershed of Coal Run. There are also underground mine complexes in the vicinity of the stream. Almost all of the watershed is in the Coal Region.

In the early 1900s, fine culm was carried into Coal Run via waste water streams from collieries. However, there were no large culm deposits on the stream below the Hickory Ridge Colliery. Trash and sewage entered the stream at Shamokin.

Watershed
The mouth of the stream is in the United States Geological Survey quadrangle of Shamokin. However, its source is in the quadrangle of Mount Carmel.

The designated uses of Coal Run are coal water and migratory fishes.

History
Coal Run was entered into the Geographic Names Information System on August 2, 1979. Its identifier in the Geographic Names Information System is 1172073. The stream is also known as Coal Run Creek.

John C. Boyd constructed a sawmill on Coal Run in the early 1800s. Coal mining was being occasionally done in the vicinity of the stream by 1825. In 1828, Daniel Derk opened a mine on Coal Run near a public road that crossed the stream. Derk was injured while working in this mine, making him the first miner to be injured in Northumberland County.

A railroad bridge historically crossed Coal Run. In the early 1900s, J.H. & C.K. Eagle, Inc. requested permission to construct a coal dredging plant on the bank of the stream.

In the early 1900s, there were several collieries and washeries in the watershed of Coal Run. These included the Hickory Ridge Colliery, the Luke Fiddler Colliery, the Hickory Swamp Washery, the Natalie Colliery, and the Colbert Colliery. The first three were owned by the Susquehanna Coal Company, the fourth was owned by the Colonial Collieries Company, and the fifth was owned by the Shipman Coal Company.

A concrete slab bridge carrying State Route 2026 over Coal Run was built in 1938. A concrete channel beam bridge carrying State Route 2017 was built over the stream in 1952 and repaired in 2007.

Biology
The drainage basin of Coal Run is designated as a Coldwater Fishery and a Migratory Fishery. Historically, in around 1840, the stream was "filled with trout".

See also
Carbon Run, next tributary of Shamokin Creek going downstream
Quaker Run, next tributary of Shamokin Creek going upstream
List of rivers of Pennsylvania
List of tributaries of Shamokin Creek

References

Rivers of Northumberland County, Pennsylvania
Tributaries of Shamokin Creek
Rivers of Pennsylvania